is a passenger railway station in located in the city of Higashiōsaka,  Osaka Prefecture, Japan, operated by the private railway operator Kintetsu Railway.

Lines
Shin-Ishikiri Station is served by the Keihanna Line, and is located 4.5 rail kilometers from the starting point of the line at Nagata Station and 22.4 kilometers from Cosmosquare Station.

Station layout
The station consists of two elevated island platforms serving three tracks, with the station building located underneath.

Platforms

History
Shin-Ishikiri Station opened on October 1, 1986

Passenger statistics
In fiscal 2018, the station was used by an average of 18,240 passengers daily.

Surrounding area
 Hishikiri Tsurugiya Shrine
Osaka Prefectural Higashi Osaka Support School
Ishikiri Seiki Hospital

See also
List of railway stations in Japan

References

External links

 Shin-Ishikiri Station 

Railway stations in Japan opened in 1986
Railway stations in Osaka Prefecture
Stations of Kintetsu Railway
Higashiōsaka